Ahora y Siempre is the seventeenth  studio album by La Mafia.  It was released on December 12, 1992. The album entered the billboard charts at number twelve. And reached number one for six weeks.

Track listing

References

1992 albums
La Mafia albums
Spanish-language albums